Boettcher Concert Hall, is a Concert Hall in Denver, Colorado and is home to the Colorado Symphony. It is named after Colorado native and philanthropist Claude K. Boettcher.

History
Boettcher was the first symphony hall in the round in the United States. Built in 1978 by Hardy Holzman Pfeiffer Associates, as a home for the Denver Symphony Orchestra, the hall is part of the Denver Performing Arts Complex, which is the second largest performing arts complex in the United States next to Lincoln Center in New York. 
Boettcher originally opened to mixed reviews. Due to its size in relation to the size of the community it serves, its 2,362  seats are often not completely filled. Tuned acoustically with a full house in mind, Boettcher originally suffered from hot and cold spots when the theater was only partially filled.

Design

In 1993, the theater underwent a major acoustical renovation. The height of the seat backs was adjusted, additional acoustic reflectors were added, and acoustic curtains were installed which allow the theater to be tuned for specific performances—even during a performance.

Tenants
The Colorado Symphony is the primary occupant of the Boettcher Concert Hall. Established in 1989 as the successor to the Denver Symphony Orchestra, the Colorado Symphony rehearses and performs primarily in Boettcher Concert Hall, but also throughout the Front Range. The orchestra draws 150,000 patrons to 90 performances every year to the concert hall. Its current president and CEO is Jerome Kern, and its current music director is Andrew Litton.

Potential Closure
In mid-2014, The Denver Post reported that the city of Denver was considering a plan to demolish Boettcher Concert Hall and build an outdoor amphitheater in its place at the Denver Performing Arts Complex. This was in tandem with a planned temporary move out at the end of the 2014-15 concert season to accommodate $17 million in upgrades of the facility. The city had also considered building a smaller venue owing to the attendance of the hall's primary occupant (Colorado Symphony) routinely filling only about half of the existing capacity.  The city explored building a venue with reconfigurable seating, allowing shows with as few as 500 attendees, to better accommodate a wider variety of performances and reach a broader audience. Denver Mayor Michael Hancock appointed a team to begin working on October 1, 2014 on the future of Boettcher Concert Hall. The debate was both about accessibility as well as the cost of making extensive repairs and renovations.

Potential plans included fixing up and managing Boettcher as a multi-use facility that could host concerts and provide educational space.  Making the space usable as a concert hall at night and a space for small classrooms. There was also discussion of adding an outdoor amphitheater. This option proved controversial, not only due to demolishing the Boettcher but also due to competition with Denver's Red Rocks Amphitheatre.
This potential move would have also involved constructing a shared box office for the three large facilities in the complex.
The Colorado Symphony Orchestra leadership was quick to present many reasons why they were a valuable tenant in the Boettcher.

See also
List of concert halls

References

External links 
 
 
  Boettcher Concert Hall Technical Information
 

Theatres in Denver
Music of Denver
Music venues in Colorado
Music venues completed in 1978
1978 establishments in Colorado